The Hill Prince Stakes is a Grade II American Thoroughbred horse race for three-year-olds run over a distance of one and one-eight miles (9 furlongs) on the turf annually in October at Belmont Park in Elmont, New York. The event offers a purse of $400,000.

History

The race is named for Christopher Chenery's Hall of Fame colt, Hill Prince.

The inaugural running took place as the Hill Prince Handicap on 26 October 1975 and was run at a distance of a mile and three-eights. It was won on a disqualification by Gustave Ring's homebred colt Don Jack.

The following year the event was scheduled in June at a distance of  miles.
 
The Hill Prince Stakes was hosted by Aqueduct Racetrack in Queens, New York in 1979, 1980, and again in 1982.

In 1981 was classified Grade III by the American Graded Stakes Committee.

The race was run in two divisions in 1982. The second division was won by Larida, the only filly to have won this event.

The event has been moved off the turf due to track conditions in 1998, 2003 and 2009 but has not had its classification downgraded.

Primarily the event had been scheduled in early spring but in 2014 NYRA moved the event to October and increased the stakes significantly to $500,000. In 2018 the event was upgraded to Grade II status.

Records
Speed record:  
1 mile:  1:33.45 – Marcavelly (2007)
 miles:  1:39.70 – Optic Nerve (1996)
 miles:  1:45.96  – Subordination (1997)

Margins:  
 lengths – Street Game (2011)

Most wins by an owner:
 4 – Klaravich Stables (1997, 2006, 2015, 2021)

Most wins by a jockey:
 4 – Ángel Cordero Jr. (1978, 1981, 1988, 1991)
 4 – Jerry Bailey (1983, 1992, 1994, 1995)

Most wins by a trainer:
 4 – William I. Mott (1993, 1995, 2007, 2017)

Winners

Legend:

 
 

Notes:

§ Ran as an entry

ƒ Filly or Mare

† In the inaugural running of the event in 1975 Annie's Brat finished first, but was disqualified and set back to second.

‡ In the 1992 running of the event Casino Magistrate finished first but was disqualified and set back to second.

See also
List of American and Canadian Graded races

References

1975 establishments in New York (state)
Horse races in New York (state)
Belmont Park
Flat horse races for three-year-olds
Turf races in the United States
Graded stakes races in the United States
Recurring sporting events established in 1975